"Oleo" is a hard bop composition by Sonny Rollins, written in 1954. Since then it has become a jazz standard, and has been played by numerous jazz artists, including Miles Davis, John Coltrane, and Bill Evans.

Form 
"Oleo" is one of a number of jazz standards to be based on the same chord progression as that employed by George Gershwin's "I Got Rhythm".

Recordings 
The first version of the song, featuring Rollins, was recorded by Miles Davis and Sonny Rollins in 1954 on the record Miles Davis with Sonny Rollins. With John Coltrane instead of Rollins on saxophone, it has been recorded again in 1956 on Relaxin'. A live version from 1958, also with Coltrane, appears on two separate Davis albums: 1958 Miles, which was released in late 1958, and Jazz at the Plaza (1973). Another Davis live version from 1961 appears on In Person Friday and Saturday Nights at the Blackhawk, Complete.

Other artists who have made notable recordings of the piece include Michael Brecker, Eric Dolphy, Lee Konitz, Jeff Sipe, Pat Martino, Patrice Rushen, and Larry Coryell.

See also
List of jazz contrafacts

References

External links
"Oleo" at jazzstandards.com

Jazz songs
1950s jazz standards
Bebop jazz standards
Hard bop jazz standards
1954 songs